TWA Flight 6963, a scheduled Transcontinental & Western Air flight from Paris Orly Airport to New York City with scheduled stops at Shannon Airport and Gander, crashed on 28 December 1946 about  west-northwest of Shannon Airport on the island of Inismacnaughton.

The flight
The flight was being operated by Lockheed L-049 Constellation NC86505, c/n 2026, named Cairo Skychief. On approach to Shannon airport the aircraft struck the ground on Inishmacnaughton and was destroyed by fire, having broken up on impact. Of the 23 people on board, nine died; four crew members and five passengers, however, a 1947 amendment to the CAB report states that nine passengers died.

This TWA flight was authorised to carry persons, property and mail between the cities of the route. It was reported in The Times that this was a mail carrying flight and that the mails were retrieved but, as of 1997, no covers have been noted.

The accident
Cairo Skychief departed Paris-Orly at 23:16 arriving at Shannon at 02:00 when Shannon control tower cleared the aircraft for approach to runway 14. During the left turn onto final, the aircraft passed behind a low hill blocking the airport lights from the pilot's vision, the aircraft lost altitude and the port wing-tip struck the ground; the aircraft crashed and caught fire.

Captain Herbert W. Tansey and First Officer Clifford V. Sparrow were seriously injured, but were among the survivors. The Irish Department of Industry and Commerce, the U.S. Civil Aeronautics Administration, and the TWA Regional Accident Board started an investigation into the crash. Investigators arrived in Shannon on 31 December for the local phase and later phases took place in London, New York, and Wilmington, with a public hearing on 30 and 31 January 1947, in New York City.

Causes
Contributory causes were determined to have been the incorrect assembly of the instruments static pipelines and the poor weather conditions.

References

Further reading

External links
 Report of the Civil Aeronautics Board - PDF

December 1946 events in Europe
1946 in Ireland
Accidents and incidents involving the Lockheed Constellation
Aviation accidents and incidents in Ireland
Aviation accidents and incidents in 1946
6963